Jethro Lennox (born 6 December 1976) is a Scottish male mountain runner who won the World Long Distance Mountain Running Challenge at the Three Peaks Race in 2008.

He was the Scottish hill running champion in 2004, 2006, 2008 and 2011.

References

External links
 

1976 births
Living people
British male long-distance runners
British male mountain runners
British sky runners
British fell runners
World Long Distance Mountain Running Championships winners